Bremen Teater is a theatre in central Copenhagen, Denmark. It seats  648 people and is used as a venue for everything from comedy shows and concerts to theatre and talks.

History
The building, which also contains Hotel Mercur, was completed in 1956. The building was designed by Danish architect Otto Frankild.

The Mercur Theater was opened by Aage Stentoft in 1965, who served as theatre director. It was used as a venue for touring theatre companies and made its own productions. Preben Kaas later succeeded Aage Stentoft as theatre director.

In 1971 the Danish charter travel tycoon Simon Spies, who owned the building, took over the theatre. He used it as a combined cinema for erotic films and night club, screening the MGM film Pretty Maids All in a Row on his fiftieth birthday for its opening. A private elevator connected the theatre to his office on the first floor and his apartment on the sixth floor. Simon Spies gave up the theatre in 1980 and it was then used by "Det Ny Musikteater" ("The New Music Theatre") until 1984. In 1985 it changed its name to Privat Teatret ("The Private Theatre") with Niels-Bo Valbro as theatre director. He chose to close the theatre in 2007 due to economic difficulties.

In 2009 the venue was revived under its current name by a group of people from the Danish entertainment industry, including Casper Christensen, Frank Hvam, Simon Kvamm and Niels Hausgaard.

Current use
The theatre has been known by its current name, Bremen Teater, since September 2009. For some time the theatre hosted the sketch show "Live fra Bremen" and the talk show "ALOHA!", which were both aired on TV2.

Since the opening of the theatre the list of acknowledged Danish names on the stage has included, among others, Casper Christensen & Frank Hvam, Niels Hausgaard, Simon Kvamm, Mew, Vi Sidder Bare Her and Anders & Peter Lund Madsen. The theatre has for several years been the selected venue for established award shows and film screenings in both the movie and music industries, hosting events such as Steppeulven, Bodil Awards, GAFFA Awards and CPH:DOX. In addition, Bremen Teater has had a number of international names on the stage, such as Laurie Anderson, David Cross, Bill Burr and Henry Rollins.

The variety of events at Bremen Teater includes comedy, theatre, concerts, award shows, film screenings, parties, talks, conferences and many others. In September 2012 the theatre opened a bar called Natbar, which won the reputable Politiken "Ibyen Award 2012" for bar of the year. Natbar has since established itself as a significant part of Copenhagen night life.

Day-to-day management of the theatre was, until summer 2013, operated by Mai Manaa Kristensen, Morten Manaa Kristensen and Nynne Mee Pilgaard. Today, the managing director of Bremen Teater is Jesper Majdall and day-to-day manager is Søren Hvidt.

References

External links
 Official website

Theatres in Copenhagen